The Heroes of Lallor are a group of fictional superheroes in the DC Comics universe. They appear in stories featured in Adventure Comics involving the Legion of Super-Heroes.

Fictional history
The original Heroes of Lallor are five super-powered youths born roughly during the same time period on Lallor, a planet run by a dictatorship. Their superpowers result from their parents' exposure to atomic radiation. Though raised by the government, they are eventually banished for opposing the dictatorship. First appearing in Adventure Comics #324, these heroes have "stronger" powers than the members of the Legion of Super-Heroes. They are tricked into fighting the Legion by a relative of the Jungle King, who had fallen in battle to the Legion previously. During the battle, Duplicate Boy and Shrinking Violet fall in love; their relationship survives this battle. The dictatorship is overthrown and the heroes choose to remain on Lallor. 

In Adventure Comics #339, one of the members, Beast Boy, who had been shunned by Lallorian society, flees to a jungle planet, Vorn. There he leads the animals on the planet in a revolt against humans. He dies saving a little girl from an attack by one of the animals. He is buried on Shanghalla, the memorial planet.

The Heroes of Lallor help the Legion out several times against the Fatal Five and Darkseid.   

Duplicate Boy and Shrinking Violet break up after Imskian rebels kidnap her and replace her in the Legion with a Durlan named . Violet confronts Duplicate Boy for uncovering the imposter via x-ray and failing to rescue her. 

The Heroes of Lallor make a single appearance in post-Zero Hour Legion continuity. In Legionnaires #49 (June 1997), Beast Boy, Gas Girl, and Splitter appear in a single panel, being told they cannot help the Legion as they are needed on Lallor. Evolvo had previously been established as a member of the Workforce.

Members
 Beast Boy (Ilshu Nor) – able to transform into any animal or beast and duplicate their special abilities. He is not related to Beast Boy, the Teen Titans member.
 Evolvo Lad (Sev Tcheru) – able to evolve into a super-intelligent human with a large cranium or devolve into a super-strong Cro-Magnon (though, in the Silver Age origin, it was a gorilla-like ape).
 Duplicate Boy (Ord Quelu or Quelu Ord) – able to duplicate any super power.
 Life Lass (Somi Gan) – able to animate any object.
 Gas Girl (Tal Nahii) – able to turn into any gas or vapor.

Notes

External links
 
 Heroes of Lallor at Cosmic Teams!
 The Unofficial Heroes of Lallor Biography

DC Comics superhero teams
DC Comics extraterrestrial superheroes
Legion of Super-Heroes